Joseph Cudjoe (born 17 October 1995) is a Ghanaian footballer, who plays for Medeama SC.

Career
Born in Takoradi, Joseph "Success" Cudjoe played with Red Bull Ghana U-17 side in the "Next Generation Trophy 2010" held in Salzburg, Austria. Since 2011 he became part of the main team of Red Bull. He also played with Vision F.C. in Ghana.

During the winter break of the 2013–14 season, he was brought by Serbian First League side FK Radnik Surdulica.  In summer 2014 player was loaned to Serbian SuperLiga side FK Radnički 1923 and returned in Winter 2014 to FK Radnik Surdulica. After his releasing by Surdulica, in summer 2015 signed 2nd time for Vision F.C. He played for the club until the end of 2019, where he joined Medeama SC on a two-year deal.

Honours
Radnik Surdulica
 Serbian First League: 2014–15

References

External links
 
 Joseph Cudjoe stats at utakmica.rs
 

1995 births
Living people
Association football midfielders
Ghanaian footballers
Ghanaian expatriate footballers
Ghanaian expatriate sportspeople in Serbia
Expatriate footballers in Serbia
Red Bull Ghana players
FK Radnik Surdulica players
FK Radnički 1923 players
Medeama SC players
Serbian First League players
Serbian SuperLiga players
Karela United FC players
Vision F.C. players